Remirema is a genus of flowering plants belonging to the family Convolvulaceae.

Its native range is Indo-China.

Species:
 Remirema bracteata Kerr

References

Convolvulaceae
Convolvulaceae genera